The 1930 Argentine Primera División was the 39th season of top-flight football in Argentina. The season began on March 23, 1930, and ended on April 12, 1931.

The Argentine league restructured as a tournament of 36 teams, playing one another once, with Boca Juniors crowning champion. Following the disruption of the 1929 season by mass abandonment of games, the second half of the 1930 season was marred in a similar way.

Final table

Relegation
The teams occupying the bottom two positions of the league were relegated. Argentino del Sud set one of the worst points tallies in the history of South American football. The other team, Honor y Patria, was relegated in its first season at the top level.

References

Argentine Primera División seasons
1930 in Argentine football
1930 in South American football